Save Me Hollywood is a Filipino pop punk band formed in 2010. The band currently consists of Julz Savard, Aaron Isaac Corvera, Kenneth Wayne Aranza, Carlos Calderon, and JR Jabla.

History
The idea of forming a female-fronted band started from Carlos Calderon sharing it with former drummer Melvin Macatiag way before Save Me Hollywood came about. It was only when Calderon met Julz Savard during a taping session for a local music channel where they both worked for did the plan came into fruition. As for the band name, ‘’We never really sat down and thought the name out. Names were just shot out, at one point, “Hollywood Ending” came to mind. But we looked it up and another band already went by that name. We literally had to think of one on the spot because it was our first gig. I forgot who, I think it was either me or Melvin who spat out, “Save Me” and it just stuck.” Savard explains on an interview and thus “Save Me Hollywood” was born.

Discography

Studio albums
Your Story to Tell (12 Stone/Universal, 2014)

Extended plays
Headlights (12 Stone/Universal, 2015)

References

Filipino rock music groups
Musical groups from Quezon City
Musical groups established in 2010
2010 establishments in the Philippines